Parliamentary elections were held in Laos on 26 March 1989, the first since 1972 and the first since the Communist takeover in 1975.

A total of 121 candidates contested the 79 seats. All candidates had to be approved by the Lao Front for National Construction, dominated by the Communist Lao People's Revolutionary Party; around two-thirds of candidates were LPRP members. The LPRP won 65 seats, with independents whose candidacies had been approved by the Front taking the remainder. Voter turnout was reported to be 98.4%.

Results

References

Laos
Elections in Laos
1989 in Laos
One-party elections
Election and referendum articles with incomplete results